Hundon is a village and civil parish in the West Suffolk district in Suffolk, England. At the south-west of the parish is the hamlet of Brockley Green which includes two farms and The Plough Inn public house.

References

External links
 Hundon Village
 Hundon School
 Genuki

Villages in Suffolk
Civil parishes in Suffolk
Borough of St Edmundsbury